Aïssa Belaout (born 12 August 1968) is an Algerian runner who specialized in the 5000 metres.

He finished fifteenth in this event at the 1996 Summer Olympics and won a silver medal at the 1993 Mediterranean Games. He also reached the final at the 1993 World Championships, but failed to finish the race.

Personal bests
800 metres - 1:52.94 min (2006)
1500 metres - 3:38.64 min (1993)
3000 metres - 7:38.70 min (1993)
5000 metres - 13:08.03 min (1993)

References

External links

1968 births
Living people
Algerian male long-distance runners
Athletes (track and field) at the 1992 Summer Olympics
Athletes (track and field) at the 1996 Summer Olympics
Olympic athletes of Algeria
Mediterranean Games silver medalists for Algeria
Mediterranean Games medalists in athletics
Athletes (track and field) at the 1993 Mediterranean Games
20th-century Algerian people